West Kendall is an unincorporated community in Dade County, Florida. The boundaries of West Kendall are imprecise, but locals commonly include the CDPs of Country Walk, Three Lakes, The Hammocks, The Crossings, Kendale Lakes, and Kendall West. West Kendall mainly consists of planned communities, apartment buildings, and strip malls.

Media
West Kendall is served by the Miami market for local radio and television. West Kendall is served by The West Kendall Gazette which is published twice monthly and is part of Miami's Community Newspapers, and West Kendall Today.com an online publication, which is partnered with the Miami Herald.

Education
Miami-Dade County Public Schools operates public schools. Schools in West End include:

High schools:
 Felix Varela High School

William Lehman Elementary, Ben Gamla Charter School, Terra Environmental Research Institute, Sunset Park Elementary, Kendale Elementary, and many others.

Colleges and universities:
 Miami-Dade College Kendall Campus

Notable residents
 Patricia Delgado and her sister Jeanette, principal dancers with the Miami City Ballet, were raised in West Kendall.

See also
West End (Florida)

References

External links
Area and Zip Code information for West Kendall

Unincorporated communities in Miami-Dade County, Florida
Unincorporated communities in Florida